John Cheng Yeow Nam (also credited as Zhong Yao Nan; known in entertainment circle as Ah Nan or Ah Nam) (1961 – 22 January 2013) was a Singaporean actor and Getai compere who made his screen debut in Money No Enough and was most notable for his criminal figure roles in various media. Liang Po Po: The Movie was one of his most notable performances of a gangster figure.

Career
Cheng's first screen appearance was in the 1998 film Money No Enough, and the following year he was cast in Liang Po Po: The Movie. Cheng was best known for portraying thuggish, brutal types prone to violence, as a homage to his alleged past career as a loan shark. I Not Stupid was a noticeable first reversal of this stereotypical role – he was cast in a minor role as a police officer tasked with rescuing hostages. Other stereotype role reversals included a minor role as a friend of the three men in That One No Enough (also his first on-screen appearance without his beard), his portrayal of an effeminate hairdresser in 2005's I Do, I Do, and his last film role as a medium in the 2013 film Judgement Day.

Cheng was more active in the getai scene as a compere, along with other part-time actors like Lin Ruping, Liu Lingling and Wang Lei.

Personal life
In a 1996 interview, Cheng opened up on his past as a hooligan. As one of five children with two parents working to support the family, Cheng was neglected and turned to smoking, violence and acts of gangsterism, under the influence of friends. He later joined a loan-shark syndicate and became a runner. Cheng worked several menial jobs before entering showbiz in 1987. He received his secondary education in Chai Chee Secondary School.

Cheng was arrested on suspicions of supplying Ecstasy in 2006. He admitted consuming the drugs but not supplying them. He was jailed at the drug rehabilitation center for a year and on home probation for six months after his release.

Cheng courted controversy when he shouted at journalists during Jack Neo's 2010 press conference on the latter's extramarital affairs. Netizens were divided over his behaviour, with some rapping him for passing off Neo's affair as a norm.

Cheng married twice and had three daughters.

Death 
In the early hours of 22 January 2013, Cheng collapsed backstage while performing at Club Cleopatra, in Parklane Shopping Mall. He died shortly thereafter aged 52, apparently from a heart attack. 

Reports later emerged that Cheng had an unhealthy habit of guzzling ten bottles of Coca-Cola daily, to sustain energy levels for his long working hours. He was also suffering from high blood pressure and high cholesterol, and was taking medication for these conditions.

Filmography 
 Money No Enough (1998)
 Hitman in the City (1998)
 Liang Po Po: The Movie (1999)
 The Mirror (1999)
 That One No Enough (1999)
 Return of the Condor Heroes (2001)
 I Not Stupid (2002)
 Homerun (2003)
 The Best Bet (2004)
 I Do, I Do (2005)
 Folks Jump Over The Wall (2008)
 Pulau Hantu (2008)
 Missing You (2008)
 Money No Enough 2 (2008)
 Where Got Ghost? (2009)
 The Ghosts Must Be Crazy (2011)
 Petaling Street Warriors (2011)
 It's a Great, Great World (2011)
 Dance Dance Dragon (2012)
 The Wedding Diary (2012)
 The Wedding Diary 2 (2013)
 Judgement Day (2013)

References

External links

Cheng hosting a getai in 2008
Cheng's Facebook account

1961 births
2013 deaths
Singaporean male actors
Singaporean people of Teochew descent